Pratyush Sinha  is a  retired Indian bureaucrat and civil servant. He served as the Central Vigilance Commissioner of India from 2006 to 2010.

Career
He is an Indian Administrative Service officer (1969 batch)  of the  Bihar cadre.

References 

Living people
Year of birth missing (living people)
Place of birth missing (living people)
Bihar cadre civil servants
Indian Administrative Service officers